Tomsk Akademgorodok is an estate in the Soviet area of Tomsk, Siberian Federal District, in which are research institutes, and have employees of the Tomsk Scientific Center of the Siberian Division of the Russian Academy of Sciences (RAS). Tomsk Akademgorodok is located in the eastern part of the Tomsk and on all sides surrounded by forests. Tomsk Akademgorodok is located on the high right bank of the river Ushaika. Its total area is 200 hectares. Construction of Tomsk Akademgorodok began in 1972. The Grand opening of the first scientific institute in Tomsk, Akademgorodok-the Institute of Atmospheric Optics, was held on January 25, 1975 .

Organizations 
 Institute of Petroleum Geology and Geophysics, Siberian Division of the RAS
 Institute of Petroleum Chemistry, Siberian Division of the RAS
 Institute for Monitoring Climatic and Ecological Systems, Siberian Division of the RAS
 Republican Scientific-Technical Center at the ISPMS SD RAS
 Institute of Atmospheric Optics, Siberian Division of the RAS
 High Current Electronics Institute, Siberian Division of the RAS
 Institute of Strength Physics and Materials Science SD RAS

Streets 
 Academic Pr
 Vavilov Street
 Korolev Street
 30 years of Victory Street

Transportation 
You can get to the Academic by bus # 5, 13/14, 16, 25, 33/34, 35/53, 131.

See also 
 Education in Russia
 Akademgorodok
 Russian Academy of Sciences
 Education in Siberia
 Tomsk
 Naukograd

External links 
 Institution of the Russian Academy of Sciences Tomsk Scientific Center, Siberian Division, Russian Academy of Sciences

Science and technology in Russia
Science and technology in Siberia
Science and technology in the Soviet Union
Tomsk
Naukograds
Buildings and structures in Tomsk Oblast